Robert Donald Emery (born March 4, 1964) was a college men's ice hockey coach at the State University of New York at Plattsburgh.  He played college hockey at Boston College from 1983 to 1986 and briefly played professional hockey with the Fredericton Express in New Brunswick and the Maine Mariners in Portland, Maine.  He has been the head men's ice hockey coach at Plattsburgh State since the 1989-1990 season.  With 465 career victories, he is the winningest hockey coach in Plattsburgh history and the 20th winningest coach in NCAA college history.  His .742 career winning percentage ranks third all-time among college coaches with at least 300 wins.

Early years
A native of Somerville, Massachusetts, Emery played hockey for Matignon High School from 1979 to 1982 and led the team to three consecutive state championships in 1979, 1980 and 1981.  Emery was named to the Massachusetts High School All-Scholastic First Team in 1981-1982.

Boston College
Emery enrolled at Boston College in 1982.  He participated in three NCAA Division I men's ice hockey tournaments while attending Boston College.  He was selected as a Hockey East All-Star as a senior in the 1985-1986 season.

Emery received a bachelor's degree in marketing from Boston College in 1986.  He also earned a master's degree in leadership at Plattsburgh State in 1990.

Professional hockey
In 1982, Emery was drafted by the Montreal Canadiens in the 10th round (208th overall pick) of the NHL Entry Draft.  He was invited to the Canadiens' training camp and later played for the Fredericton Express, the Quebec Nordiques affiliate in the American Hockey League.  He also played with the Maine Mariners.

Plattsburgh State
In 1988, Emery became an assistant men's hockey coach at Plattsburgh State while studying for his master's degree. After one season as an assistant, he was promoted to head coach for the 1989-1990 hockey season. Emery led Plattsburgh to the NCAA Tournament in 18 of the next 30 seasons. His teams have won two national championships and advanced to the Frozen Four nine times in 1990, 1992, 1998, 2000, 2001, 2002, 2004, 2008 and 2010. His best record came in 1992 when Emery led Plattsburgh to a 32-2-2 record and its first NCAA national championship. Emery's second national championship came in 2001 and resulted from beating the previously undefeated RIT Tigers in the finals. Emery announced his retirement from coaching at the end of the 2018–19 season and was 11th all-time in wins with 624 when he hung up his whistle.

Merrimack
Shortly after wrapping up his coaching career, Emery was hired by Merrimack to be the Director of Hockey operations.

Career statistics

Regular season and playoffs

Head Coaching Record

Awards and honors

See also
 List of college men's ice hockey coaches with 400 wins

References

External links

1964 births
Boston College Eagles men's ice hockey players
Fredericton Express players
Ice hockey players from Massachusetts
Maine Mariners players
Montreal Canadiens draft picks
Sportspeople from Somerville, Massachusetts
State University of New York at Plattsburgh alumni
State University of New York at Plattsburgh faculty
Living people
American men's ice hockey defensemen